Ben Hinchliffe (born 9 October 1987) is an English professional footballer who plays as a goalkeeper for  club Stockport County. He played in the Football League for Tranmere Rovers.

Early life
Hinchliffe was born in Preston, Lancashire.

Career

Preston North End
In April 2006, Hinchliffe was given a one-year professional contract with Preston North End after impressing in the youth and reserve teams. He was loaned out to Northern Premier League Premier Division club Kendal Town at the start of the 2006–07 season. Hinchliffe made 10 appearances, giving some impressive performances before returning to Deepdale in October 2006, and needed knee surgery after picking an injury.

Tranmere Rovers
On recovery, in February 2007, Hinchliffe joined League One team Tranmere Rovers on loan originally for one month as cover after John Achterberg picked up a knee injury, though this was twice extended, initially for another month and then until the end of the season. Hinchliffe made his Tranmere and Football League debut on 28 April 2007, as a 21st minute substitute in the 1–1 draw versus Crewe Alexandra, following fellow goalkeeper Gavin Ward's dismissal for handling outside the box., Hinchliffe made his full a week later in a 3–1 victory versus Brentford., his last game at the club. Upon his return to Preston, Hinchliffe was released, along with five other players, on 8 May 2007.

Derby County
On 10 July 2007, Hinchliffe joined newly promoted Premier League side Derby County on a two-year contract, teaming up with former Preston North End manager Billy Davies. He was released from his contract at the end of the 2007/08 season by new manager Paul Jewell.

Move into Non-League
He subsequently joined Oxford United on non-contract terms. After leaving Oxford, Hinchliffe spent time playing for Worcester City and again for Kendal Town before joining Bamber Bridge. In June 2011 he joined Northwich Victoria. He moved on to AFC Fylde in May 2012.

Stockport County
In May 2016, Hinchliffe joined Stockport County and kept 29 clean sheets in his first two seasons with the club. Hinchliffe played every league match as County took the National League North title in 2018–19 and was selected in the league's team of the season. He remained number one choice at Edgeley Park throughout the entirety of County's 2nd stay in the National League. In the 2020–21 season Hinchliffe was selected in the National League team of the season, despite County missing out on promotion, losing in the play-offs to Hartlepool United. Hinchliffe was an integral part of County's title-winning season in 2021–22, a season in which he surpassed the 100 clean sheet barrier, becoming the first goalkeeper in the clubs history to reach such a milestone. He kept another 5 clean sheets as County secured the title with a 2–0 home win against FC Halifax Town. At the start of the following season he was criticised by manager Dave Challinor for a poor performance after Stockport lost their first League Two game 3–2 at home to Barrow on July 30, 2022.  After an injury to on-loan keeper Vítězslav Jaroš, Hinchliffe returned to keep five consecutive clean sheets to help County move clear of the bottom of the table in October.

Honours
Stockport County
National League: 2021–22
National League North: 2018–19

Individual
Conference North Team of the Year: 2014–15
National League North Team of the Year: 2018-19
National League Team of the Year: 2020–21
 Most appearances for Stockport County as a Goalkeeper, 307

References

External links

1987 births
Living people
Footballers from Preston, Lancashire
English footballers
Association football goalkeepers
Preston North End F.C. players
Kendal Town F.C. players
Tranmere Rovers F.C. players
Derby County F.C. players
Oxford United F.C. players
Worcester City F.C. players
Bamber Bridge F.C. players
Northwich Victoria F.C. players
AFC Fylde players
Stockport County F.C. players
English Football League players
National League (English football) players